The Doomgrinder is an adventure module for the Dungeons & Dragons fantasy roleplaying game, set in the game's World of Greyhawk campaign setting.

Plot summary
The Doomgrinder was published by TSR, Inc. in 1998.

Publication history
The module was published by Wizards of the Coast in 1998 under its recently acquired TSR imprint for the second edition Advanced Dungeons & Dragons rules. It is the final of the three adventures in the "Lost Tombs" series for the Greyhawk setting and is therefore a sequel to The Star Cairns and Crypt of Lyzandred the Mad.

Reception

References

External links
 The Doomgrinder at the TSR Archive

Greyhawk modules
Role-playing game supplements introduced in 1998